Humphrey Slade, EBS, KBE (4 May 1905 – 13 August 1983) was a British-born Kenyan lawyer and politician who served as a member of the Legislative Council and later the National Assembly between 1952 and 1970. He was the inaugural Speaker of the National Assembly, from 1967 to 1970.
He had his residential house in Nyandarua next to Karima Girls High School

Biography
Slade was born in Kensington, London to George Slade, a solicitor, and his wife Edith Beale. He was a King's Scholar at Eton College and later read jurisprudence at Magdalen College, Oxford. He completed his articles with Gibson and Weldon and qualified as a solicitor in 1930.

He migrated to Kenya in October 1930 and practised as a lawyer with Hamilton Harrison and Mathews in Nairobi. When the Second World War broke out in 1939, he was made Deputy Judge Advocate of the East African Forces, remaining in the position until 1941. In 1945, whilst still in Kenya, he came of the roll of solicitors in England and Wales in order to gain a call to the bar at Lincoln's Inn.

In 1952, he was elected to the Legislative Council from the Aberdares constituency. He served as speaker of the Legislative Council from 1960 until Kenyan independence in 1963. He then served as speaker of the newly established House of Representatives between 1963 and 1967, and that latter year he was unanimously elected as the inaugural Speaker of the National Assembly of Kenya. He retired from public life in 1970 and died in Nairobi in 1984.

He was an experienced mountain climber, and may have been one of the climbers referred to by John Hunt when he wrote that there were likely Commonwealth candidates for the 1953 British Mount Everest Expedition from Kenya and New Zealand.

References

1905 births
1983 deaths
Speakers of the National Assembly of Kenya
Alumni of Magdalen College, Oxford
British emigrants to Kenya
Elders of the Order of the Burning Spear
Honorary Knights Commander of the Order of the British Empire
20th-century Kenyan lawyers
Members of Lincoln's Inn
People educated at Eton College
Politicians from London
English barristers
English mountain climbers
Kenyan mountain climbers
Members of the Legislative Council of Kenya
White Kenyan people
British Kenya people
20th-century English lawyers